Rylan can refer to:

 Emme Rylan (born 1980), American actress
 Rylan Clark (born 1988), English presenter
 Rylan Galiardi (born 1986), American-Canadian professional ice hockey player
 Rylan Hainje (born 1980), American basketball player
 Rylan Reed (born 1981), former American football and baseball player
 "Rylan", a song on the 2019 album I Am Easy to Find by The National

See also
Ryland (disambiguation)
Rylands